Agios Kosmas is a village, a community and a municipal unit of the Grevena municipality. Before the 2011 local government reform it was an independent municipality. The municipality was established in 1997 with the name Kosmas o Aitolos, which was changed to Agios Kosmas in 2004. The seat of the municipality was in Megaro. The 2011 census recorded 49 residents in the village, 75 residents in the community and 870 residents in the municipal unit. The community of Agios Kosmas covers an area of 9.496 km2 while the municipal unit covers an area of 115.087 km2. The village is named after the 18th-century saint Cosmas the Aetolian.

Administrative division
The municipal unit of Agios Kosmas consists of nine communities: Agios Kosmas, Dasyllio, Kalirachi, Kalloni, Kydonies, Kyparissi, Megaro, Oropedio and Trikorfo.

The community of Agios Kosmas consists of three settlements: Agios Kosmas, Ano Ekklisia and Ekklisia.

Population
According to the 2011 census, the population of the municipal unit of Agios Kosmas was 870 people, a decrease of almost 49% compared to the previous census of 2001.

See also
 List of settlements in the Grevena regional unit

References

Populated places in Grevena (regional unit)
Former municipalities in Western Macedonia